Helen Gourlay and Kerry Harris were the defending champions.

Seeds

Draw

Finals

Top half

Bottom half

References

External links
 1973 Australian Open – Women's draws and results at the International Tennis Federation

Women's Doubles
Australian Open (tennis) by year – Women's doubles